Michael Noel Skivington (24 December 1921 – 2 March 2012) was a Scottish professional football centre half who played in the Football League for Gillingham, Leyton Orient and Rochdale. He also played in Scotland for St Anthony's and Alloa Athletic and in Ireland for Dundalk. He made one appearance for the League of Ireland XI.

Career statistics

Honours 
Dundalk

 FAI Cup: 1948–49
 Dublin City Cup: 1948–49

References 

Footballers from Glasgow
Scottish footballers
English Football League players
Scottish Football League players
1921 births
2012 deaths
Association football midfielders
St Anthony's F.C. players
Alloa Athletic F.C. players
Rochdale A.F.C. players
Dundalk F.C. players
Leyton Orient F.C. players
Gillingham F.C. players
League of Ireland players
League of Ireland XI players
Scottish expatriate sportspeople in Ireland
Scottish expatriate footballers
Expatriate association footballers in the Republic of Ireland
Scottish Junior Football Association players